Robert Henry Jordan (February 6, 1916 – October 23, 1992) was a justice of the Supreme Court of Georgia from 1972 to 1980, and chief justice from 1980 to 1982.

Early life, education, and career
Born in Talbot County, Georgia, Jordan attended the public schools, and received a J.D. from the University of Georgia School of Law in 1941. He served in the United States Army during World War II, from 1941 to 1946, achieving the rank of major. He practiced law beginning in 1946 in the Talbotton, Georgia. In 1953, he was elected to Georgia State Senate, serving again as President Pro-Tem in 1959. He briefly served on the Georgia State Highway Board in 1960, but later that year Governor Ernest Vandiver appointed Jordan to the Georgia Court of Appeals,  where he served until 1972.

Service on the Supreme Court of Georgia
In March 1972, Governor Jimmy Carter appointed Jordan to the Supreme Court of Georgia. Jordan became Chief Justice December 20, 1980 and served in that capacity until November 1, 1982.

Jordan also wrote a history of his home county, There Was a Land, a history of Talbot County, Georgia.

U.S. Route 80 between downtown Talbotton and the Taylor County line has been renamed the Robert Henry Jordan Memorial Highway in his honor.

References

Chief Justices of the Supreme Court of Georgia (U.S. state)
Justices of the Supreme Court of Georgia (U.S. state)
1916 births
1992 deaths
University of Georgia School of Law alumni
20th-century American judges
United States Army personnel of World War II